Semedo is a Portuguese surname. Notable people with the surname include:

Álvaro Semedo (1586–1658 or 1659), Portuguese Jesuit, Vice-Provincial of Jesuit China Mission in south China during the Ming/Qing changeover
António Semedo, former Portuguese football forward
Cafú (footballer, born 1977), real name Arlindo Gomes Semedo, Cape Verdean football forward
Cícero Semedo, Guinea-Bissauan football forward
, Portuguese poet
Gil Semedo, Cape Verdean singer
José Filipe Correia Semedo, Cape Verdean football forward
José Orlando Semedo, former Portuguese football midfielder
José Vítor Moreira Semedo, Portuguese football defender
Leandro Semedo, Cape Verdean handball player
Nélson Cabral Semedo,  Portuguese football right-back
Maria Helena Semedo
Rúben Semedo, Portuguese football defender

See also 
 Semedo (chess)

Portuguese-language surnames